is a train station located in Chūō-ku, Fukuoka.

Lines 

Nishi-Nippon Railroad
Tenjin Ōmuta Line

This subway station's symbol mark is a mortar and pestle, because  means medicinal plant botanical garden in Japanese.

Platforms

Nishitetsu

Fukuoka City Subway

Adjacent stations 

|-
|colspan=5 style="text-align:center;" |Nishi-Nippon Railroad

External links
 Subway Yakuin Station 

Railway stations in Fukuoka Prefecture
Railway stations in Japan opened in 1927